Philip Twisleton, born  1616, died 13 June 1678, was a member of the landed gentry from North Yorkshire, who served as a colonel in the New Model Army during the Wars of the Three Kingdoms.

Biography
Philip Twisleton was the son of John Twislkton, of Drax and Barley, Yorkshire, and of Horsmans Place in Dartford, and Margaret, daughter of William Constable. He had an elder brother, John (1614–1682), and a younger, George (1618–1667), who also served in the Parliamentarian army.

Twisleton was colonel of a cavalry regiment in the New Model Army, and was knighted by Oliver Cromwell, the Lord Protector, on 1 February 1658. The knighthood was voided after the Stuart Restoration in May 1660.

Family
Philip Twisleton married Ann, daughter of John Brograve (born 1597) of Hamells and Hannah, daughter of Sir Thomas Barnardiston. They had two sons:
 John (died 1721), the eldest son and heir, who inherited Horsmans Place from his uncle John and died childless.
 Thomas, who became a reverend and had at least one child, a daughter named Mary.

References

Sources
 
 
 
 
 
 

1678 deaths
Roundheads
People from Selby District
Year of birth unknown
Parliamentarian military personnel of the English Civil War